Pedro Torres Cruces (born 27 April 1949 in Humilladero) is a Spanish former road bicycle racer. He was a GC contender in Grand Tours.

His first was the 1972 Vuelta. In the following year he placed 5th overall in the Vuelta and won the King of the Mountains competition, as well as a stage in the 1973 Tour de France. Late in the year at the World Championships he finished 6th.

In 1975 he took a top 10 in the Volta a Catalunya and then in the Vuelta he came up just short of winning the King of the Mountains while finishing 14th overall. In the Tour he finished 10th while taking a 4th place at the World Championships. In 1976 he started with another top 10 in the Volta a Catalunya, finished 9th in the 1976 Vuelta a España and just inside the top 20 in the Tour.

He began 1977 with another top 10 in the Volta a Catalunya and had a very strong performance in the 77 Vuelta winning stage 15, winning the King of the Mountains and finishing top 10 overall. He then rode the 1977 Critérium du Dauphiné Libéré and finished top 10 in a race that included Hinault, Merckx, Zoetemelk, Van Impe, Agostinho, Danguillaume and Thévenet. In the Tour he had his worst finish to date coming in just inside the top 20.

In 1978 he started off the year with a podium placing in the Volta a Catalunya. He also skipped the 78 Vuelta in favor of riding Paris–Nice and the Giro d'Italia for the first time. In the Giro he took two top 5 stage finishes en route to a top 20 finish. In 1979 he had another top 5 in the Volta a Catalunya, rode the Tour de Suisse for the first time and returned to the Vuelta where he finished 6th.

The 1980 Vuelta a España was the final Vuelta of his career as well as his strongest performance. He finished on the stage podium in each of the ITT's and finished in 2nd place overall. The 1980 Tour de France was his 15th and final grand tour. Nearly his entire team abandoned the race with only Jorge Fortia and Vicente Belda finishing with him.

Major results

1971
 7th Overall Vuelta a Andalucía
1972 
 3rd Clásica de Sabiñánigo
 7th Overall Volta a Catalunya
 8th Overall Volta a Portugal
1973
 Tour de France
 1st  Mountains classification
 1st Stage 14 
 3rd Overall Vuelta a Asturias
 5th Overall Vuelta a España
 5th Road race, National Road Championships
 6th Road race, UCI World Road Championships
1974
 1st Subida a Arrate
 3rd Overall Volta a la Comunitat Valenciana
 7th Overall Tour of the Basque Country
 7th Overall Setmana Catalana de Ciclisme
 10th Overall Tour de France
1975
 3rd Overall Vuelta a Aragón
 3rd Overall Vuelta a Cantabria
 4th Overall Grand Prix du Midi Libre
 4th Road race, UCI World Road Championships
 5th Trofeo Masferrer
 6th Klasika Primavera
 7th Overall Tour of the Basque Country
 8th Overall Volta a Catalunya
 10th Overall Volta a la Comunitat Valenciana
1976 
 3rd Overall Vuelta a Cantabria
 6th Overall Volta a Catalunya
 7th Overall Tour of the Basque Country
 7th Overall Grand Prix du Midi Libre
 9th Overall Vuelta a España
 9th Road race, National Road Championships
 10th Overall Setmana Catalana de Ciclisme
1977
 1st Stage 1 (ITT) Escalada a Montjuïc
 Vuelta a España
 1st  Mountains classification
 1st Stage 15 
 3rd Overall Vuelta a Cantabria
 4th Trofeo Masferrer
 6th Overall Volta a la Comunitat Valenciana
 6th GP Villafranca de Ordizia
 8th Clásica de Sabiñánigo
 9th Overall Setmana Catalana de Ciclisme
 9th Road race, National Road Championships
 10th Overall Critérium du Dauphiné Libéré
 10th Overall Volta a Catalunya
1978
 2nd Overall Vuelta a Cantabria
 3rd Overall Volta a Catalunya
 3rd Trofeo Masferrer 
 5th Road race, National Road Championships
 7th Overall Setmana Catalana de Ciclisme
1979 
 2nd Overall Vuelta a Cantabria
 4th Overall Volta a Catalunya
 6th Overall Vuelta a España
 9th Overall Vuelta a Andalucía
1980 
 2nd Overall Vuelta a España
 2nd Overall Vuelta a Cantabria
 1st Stage 5b 
 5th Road race, National Road Championships

Grand Tour general classification results timeline

References

External links 

Official Tour de France results for Pedro Torres

1949 births
Living people
Spanish male cyclists
Spanish Tour de France stage winners
Spanish Vuelta a España stage winners
Sportspeople from the Province of Málaga
Cyclists from Andalusia